Fabula is a genus of moths of the family Noctuidae.

Species
 Fabula zollikoferi (Freyer, 1836)

References
Fabula at funet

Xyleninae